Ballysaggart GAA is a Gaelic Athletic Association club based in Ballysaggart, County Waterford, Ireland. The club enters teams in hurling each year, which includes 2 adult hurling teams in the Waterford Senior Hurling Championship and the Western Junior Hurling “C” Championship, and had briefly returned to participating in Gaelic football entering a team in the West Waterford Junior Football Championship in 2015, after a lapse of ten years.  Ballysaggart has no underage teams.  Instead the club is amalgamated with Lismore GAA for underage teams and play as Naomh Carthach.

Ballysaggart won the first competition organised by the GAA, the 1885 Waterford Senior Football Championship. In 2020, 135 years later, the club played their inaugural hurling campaign at the senior grade.

Honours
Waterford Senior Football Championships: 1
 1885
Waterford Intermediate Hurling Championships: 1
 2019
Munster Intermediate Club Hurling Championship Runners-up
 2019
Waterford Junior Hurling Championships: 4
 1972, 1992, 2007, 2013
Munster Junior Club Hurling Championships: 1
 2013

Notable players

 Shane Bennett
 Stephen Bennett
 Kieran Bennett
 Jack Roche

References
2. http://www.hoganstand.com/Cork/ArticleForm.aspx?ID=88237

http://www.hoganstand.com/Cork/ArticleForm.aspx?ID=88237

Gaelic games clubs in County Waterford
Hurling clubs in County Waterford
Gaelic football clubs in County Waterford